In probability theory and statistics, a normal variance-mean mixture with mixing probability density  is the continuous probability distribution of a random variable  of the form

The conditional distribution of  given  is thus a normal distribution with mean  and variance . A normal variance-mean mixture can be thought of as the distribution of a certain quantity in an inhomogeneous population consisting of many different normal distributed subpopulations. It is the distribution of the position of a Wiener process (Brownian motion) with drift  and infinitesimal variance  observed at a random time point independent of the Wiener process and with probability density function . An important example of normal variance-mean mixtures is the generalised hyperbolic distribution in which the mixing distribution is the generalized inverse Gaussian distribution.

The probability density function of a normal variance-mean mixture with mixing probability density  is

 

and its moment generating function is

 

where  is the moment generating function of the probability distribution with density function , i.e.

See also
 Normal-inverse Gaussian distribution
 Variance-gamma distribution

References

O.E Barndorff-Nielsen, J. Kent and M. Sørensen (1982): "Normal variance-mean mixtures and z-distributions", International Statistical Review, 50, 145–159.

Continuous distributions
Compound probability distributions